Qurayat (also Al Qurayat or Gurayat) is a city located in Al Jawf Province, in northern Saudi Arabia. Qurayat had a population of 147,550 at the 2010 Census. It is a small city with a very big market. Qurayyat is known for its olives and salt.

Al-Hadithah border crossing 
Al-Hadithah border crossing is the largest and most important border crossing in Saudi Arabia. It is located 30 km west of the city of Qurayyat, and is the one of the largest land crossings in the Middle East, linking to Jordan and indirectly to Syria, Lebanon and Turkey, both for people coming for Hajj and Umrah as well as for cargo export and import.

Climate
In Qurayyat, there is a desert climate. Most rain falls in the winter. The Köppen-Geiger climate classification is BWh. About  of precipitation falls annually.

Livelihood of the population 
 Grazing: due to natural pastures along the Wadi Sirhan at all times of the year.
 Industry: based on agricultural products such as olive oil - and canning salt and olive extract.
 Trade: border area direct land trade.
 Agriculture: olive cultivation and some crops suited to the quality of the soil

Hospitals 
There are two main albeit small hospitals in Gurayat: Gurayat General Hospital and King Faisal Hospital.

Gurayat General Hospital (GGH) 
Gurayat General Hospital is 350-bed secondary referral center with a catchment area of almost 400 km area with referrals from seven district general hospitals, each comprising 50 beds, and many primary health centres. It has almost all branches of surgery, namely, general surgery with minimal access surgical facilities, neurosurgery, urology, paediatric surgery, orthopaedics, ENT, maxillo-facial, ophthalmology.

There is a very busy accident & emergency (A & E) department, led by a general surgeon, two specialists and 14 residents, having fully equipped resuscitation room, with 5 beds, triage areas, observation rooms, cubicles, plaster and minor surgery procedure rooms (clean and dirty), Ob ER, pediatric ER. The total number of beds in ER is 27.  This hospital receives emergency referrals for general surgery, neurosurgery, pediatric surgery, urology and other specialties on daily basis.  As the number of population is increased in this area, so is the number of attendants in A & E with last year being just above 100,000.  A & E is just next to fully equipped radiology department, having two emergency X-rays for male and female patients, with emergency facilities for two helical CT scans, and MRI, portable US, covered by radiologists on call.  A & E is backed up by 20 bed fully equipped ICU, with a resident and specialist on duty round the clock, and PICU, NICU.  We have a separate burn unit where major burns are treated.

Airports 
The city has a domestic airport (IATA: URY, ICAO: OEGT) about 10 km from the center. It operates by Saudia to Riyadh and Jeddah. The nearest airport is Turaif Domestic Airport.

Other transport facilities 
Other transport include the main bus facilities

There is a new proposed railway facility going under construction, the Saudi Railway (SAR) to link Qurayyat, Saudi Arabia and Riyadh.

Buildings and structures 
At 31.585774 N 37.900386 E there is a 468 metres high guyed radio mast. Close to this, at 31.583635 N 37.903883 E, there is a 458 metres high guyed radio mast.

Schools 
There are many Arabic schools in Gurayat. The only English IGCSE school is in Sakakah. The nearest university is Al Jouf University.

Tourism
Al Qurayyat's most important tourist destination point is Ka'af castle. It is located in the Ka'af village next to the castle Mountain Saidi from the east, which is a historic mansion built in 1338 AH by Sheikh Nawaf al-Shaalan before subject area of Saudi rule, a castle warship shape built of stone sedimentary limestone white witharchitectural style unique to the rocky area, and consists of a number of rooms for residential use and other management and some ammunition stores, with four towers at each corner is a square shape.

Archaeological sites 
 Castle Mountain Saidi: located to the north-west of Ka'af castle.

References

External links
 Al Jouf School
 SAPTCO
 Al Jouf University

Populated places in Al-Jawf Province